Nisi may be:
Nisi language (China)
Nisi language (India)